Freyberg High School is a state co-educational secondary school located in the suburb of Roslyn in Palmerston North, New Zealand.

Freyberg High School is named for hero of both world wars, Lord Bernard Freyberg, who is known for his service in the Gallipoli Campaign during the First World War and later service commanding the New Zealand Expeditionary Force during the Second World War. Freyberg served as the 7th Governor-General of New Zealand from 1946 to 1952.

The school is located at the end of Freyberg Street, Palmerston North and is bordered by Skoglund Park on the east and Ross Intermediate School on the west.  To the north are the netball courts of Vautier Park. Also present is the Freyberg Community Pool, which is open to the public for leisure.

History
The school was founded in 1955 and named for World War II hero and former Governor General, Bernard Freyberg. His name is reflected not only in the name of the school, but also of the school's gymnasium, Lord Freyberg Memorial Gymnasium. In addition, the school's mascot is the salamander, which was Freyberg's nom de guerre during the First World War. The school's yearbook, the Salamander, also adopts this name. The name given to him by Māori, Te Pou Hōia, is also reflected in the Māori name for the school.

Like most New Zealand state secondary schools built in the mid-1950s, Freyberg High School is of Henderson-type construction, with long single-storey classrooms blocks of timber construction interconnected by a central spine. Additional classroom facilities have been built over the years to aid in the growing student numbers.

In 1993, Russell Trethewey took on the post of Principal. By his retirement and replacement by Michael McMenamin in 2004, the school roll had reached over 1200. At the end of 2008, McMenamin returned to New Plymouth Boys' High School after five years at Freyberg High School. He was replaced as Principal by long-serving Deputy Principal Peter Brooks.

In 2005, the school celebrated its 50th Jubilee and in 2015, celebrated its 60th Jubilee.

In October 2022, Brooks retired as Principal after more than a decade in the role. He was replaced by Whangaparaoa College deputy principal Graeme Williams.

Sports

Rivalries 
Freyberg High School annually conducts sports exchanges with Taradale High School and Kapiti College. The junior school also participates in a Central Six competition. There is also a rivalry between Freyberg and Awatapu College for the Mark Ranby Trophy in rugby union.

Arts

Dance 
Freyberg High School regularly competes in the Dance NZmade interschool competition in both regional and national levels, winning the regional final in 2018 and again reaching the national finals in 2019.

Music 
Freyberg High School is renowned for its musical groups, with many reaching regional and national finals in choral and orchestral competitions. Choral group Bella and the Fellas has won regional awards at the Manawatū-Whanganui Big Sing every year since 2017. Female barbershop choir Miss Demeanor has also had national acclaim, reaching the Barbershop Harmony National Finals in 2019.

School structure

Class structure

Freyberg High School works along the vertical structure with whānau groups which includes Year 9 through to Year 13 along house lines. The teacher of the whānau group is in the same house as his or her students.

Prior to 2002, there were horizontally structured tutor groups in which there was only one year level per group. Likewise, these groups were based on houses, with all students being in the same house. Before 2001, there was a mixture of houses within one tutor group.

In 2016, coaching classes were introduced to support students for the whole five years they attend the school. Students are taught beneficial skills such as time management, planning goals, career paths and study advice. The classes are sorted into individual year levels with one 'coach' who monitors the students throughout their journey from Year 9 to Year 13. It is held almost every week and replaces the whānau group time slot on Wednesdays.

House system 
For the purposes of school structure and intraschool competition, Freyberg High School is divided into four houses of roughly equal size. All students belong to one of the houses. Each house has a name relevant to the region and has reference to Te Rauparaha; the names are as follows:

Facilities of the School
Freyberg High School offers a range of facilities for its students.

 Sports Academy
 Music Academy
 Dance Academy
 Drama Academy
 Musical Theatre Academy
 Russell Trethewey Performing Arts Centre 
 Craig Centre - Special Education block
 Deaf Education Unit
 Teen Parents' Unit
 Rumaki - Māori Immersion Classes
 Covered Heated Swimming Pool (Freyberg Community Pool)
 Multi-sport turf

People

Notable staff 
Notable staff, past and present include:

 Fiona Farrell, Author
 Delia Hannah, Actress
 Peter Ingram, Central Districts cricketer
Margaret Kouvelis, Former Mayor of Manawatu
 Moira Senior, Black Stick
 Tangi Utikere, Labour MP for Palmerston North (2020-)

Notable alumni

Politics
 Jacqui Dean, former television and radio host, now National MP for Otago (2005–2008) and Waitaki (2008-)
 Darien Fenton, Labour List MP (2005-2014)
Steve Maharey, former Labour MP for Palmerston North (1990–2008), Vice-Chancellor of Massey University, Palmerston North (2009-2017)

Sport

 Ken Grainger, Former All Black
 Vivien Haddon, Commonwealth Games silver and bronze medalist and NZ Olympic representative.
 Sylvia Potts, Olympic and Commonwealth Games 1500m Runner
 Mark Ranby, former All Black
 Selica Winiata, New Zealand Sevens and New Zealand Women's rugby player

Entertainment
 David D'Ath, singer, The Skeptics
 Lyn McConchie, International Science Fiction and Fantasy author
 Benjamin "Benny" Tipene, The X Factor NZ 2013

Notes

Schools in Palmerston North
Secondary schools in Manawatū-Whanganui